Metzer (lit. Border) is a kibbutz in northern Israel. Located near the Green Line to the north of Baqa al-Gharbiyye, it falls under the jurisdiction of Menashe Regional Council.

History
The kibbutz was founded on 8 September 1953 by immigrants from Argentina. In November 2002, a Palestinian terrorist infiltrated the kibbutz and murdered 5 people including a mother and her two sons. The perpetrator, Sirhan Sirhan, was killed a year later by the Yamam.

References

External links
Official website 

Argentine-Jewish culture in Israel
Kibbutzim
Kibbutz Movement
Menashe Regional Council
Populated places established in 1953
Populated places in Haifa District
1953 establishments in Israel